Golyshevo is a rural locality (a selo) in Pervomaysky Selsoviet, Pervomaysky District, Altai Krai, Russia. The population was 220 as of 2013. There are 6 streets.

Geography 
Golyshevo is located 50 km north of Novoaltaysk (the district's administrative centre) by road. Pervomayskoye is the nearest rural locality.

References 

Rural localities in Pervomaysky District, Altai Krai